is a Japanese manga artist best known for his work on the manga Outlaw Star from his affiliated Morning Star Studio. He was also the primary creative mind behind other works of fiction set in the Toward Stars universe including the Uchuu Eiyuu Monogatari manga and Angel Links anime series.

Career
Before founding Morning Star Studio in his late 20s, Itō studied planning and editing at the design office Shindosha. He began work as a manga editor, but found the job dull and began drawing manga himself. Some of his earliest works, including , were created under the pen name "Black Point". Many of Itō's animation works are credited to the name .  Under this name he designed a transforming toy that would later become Unicron.

Itō's science fiction manga  started serialization in the monthly Kadokawa Shoten magazine Comic Comp in 1988 with five tankōbon (collected volume) releases between 1989 and 1991. During that time, Itō came up with initial concept of the anime television franchise NG Knight Lamune & 40. His next major manga series, was serialized in the Shueisha magazine V Jump beginning in 1993. Three tankōbon were published between 1994 and 1995. Uchuu Eiyuu Monogatari was shortly thereafter picked up by Shueisha and was published in a total of eight volumes throughout 1996.

Itō was eventually offered a job at Marvel Comics, but he was unsure he would be able to fit it into his schedule. However, Itō joined Marvel after talking with C.B. Cebulski in 2002.

Works

Manga
Good Morning Althea (1986, serialized in C-Live)
Uchuu Eiyuu Monogatari (1988–1992, serialized in Comic Comp; 1995–1996, serialized in Ultra Jump)
Haō Taikei Ryū Knight (1993–1995, serialized in V Jump)
Outlaw Star (1996–1999, serialized in Ultra Jump)
K.O. Seiki Beast Sanjushi Gaiden: Birth of the V-Bi-DARN (1999, published by Kadokawa Shoten)
Ohma ni Doki Doki! (2002, published by Kadokawa Shoten)

Anime
Good Morning Althea (1987, original creator)
Gunbuster (1988, set designer)
New Story of Aura Battler Dunbine (1988, character designer)
Patlabor: The Movie (1989, mechanical designer)
Assemble Insert (1989–1990, guest character designer)
NG Knight Ramune & 40 (1990–1991, original creator)
Detonator Orgun (1991–1992, mechanical designer)
K.O. Beast (1992–1993, character designer)
D-1 Devastator (1992, mechanical designer)
Haō Taikei Ryū Knight (1994–1995, original creator)
The Vision of Escaflowne (1996, design assistant)
Agent Aika (1997, guest character designer)
Outlaw Star (1998, original creator)
Angel Links (1999, character designer)
Zegapain (2006, original creator)
Yu-Gi-Oh! 5D's (2008–2011, design assistant)

Video games
Galaxy Fraulein Yuna (1992, art designer)
Alisia Dragoon (1992, character designer)
Thousand Arms (1998, character designer)
SF Adventure Zero One SP (2004, character designer)
Zwei Worter (2007, art designer)

Book illustrations
Ao no Kishi Beruzeruga Monogatari
Hijiri El Crusaders Saint
Nangoku Sentai Shureio
Uchuu Goukai Daizappa
Watashino Yuusha Sama
Avenir Wosagashite
Wolf Zone
A Kun (17) no Sensou
Hijiri Koku 1092
Famikon Hisshoubon
Sword World RPG Replay Part 2

References

Outlaw Star
Anime character designers
Living people
Manga artists from Hokkaido
People from Kitami, Hokkaido
Sunrise (company) people
Year of birth missing (living people)